Ladislav Krejčí (born 20 April 1999) is a Czech footballer who plays as a midfielder for AC Sparta Prague.

Club career

Zbrojovka Brno
Krejčí made his professional debut for Zbrojovka Brno in their home match against Sparta Prague on 2 October 2016, which ended in a 3–3 draw. He scored his first league goal on 13 May 2018 in Brno's 4–1 win at Teplice.

Career statistics

Club

References

External links
 Profile at FC Zbrojovka Brno official site
 Profile at fotbal.idnes.cz
 Profile at FAČR official site

Living people
1999 births
People from Rosice
Czech footballers
Association football midfielders
Czech Republic youth international footballers
Czech Republic under-21 international footballers
Czech First League players
FC Zbrojovka Brno players
AC Sparta Prague players
Sportspeople from the South Moravian Region